Georgi Dimitrov Nikolov (born 11 June 1937) is a Bulgarian former footballer who played as a defender for the Bulgaria national team in the 1962 FIFA World Cup. He also played for CDNA.

References

External links
FIFA profile

Living people
1937 births
Bulgarian footballers
Association football defenders
Bulgaria international footballers
1962 FIFA World Cup players
First Professional Football League (Bulgaria) players
PFC CSKA Sofia players